The ninth season of Shameless, an American comedy-drama television series based on the British series of the same name by Paul Abbott, was announced on November 8, 2017, following the season 8 premiere. The season premiered on September 9, 2018, and consisted of 14 episodes, split into two seven-episode parts. The second half of the season premiered on January 20, 2019. The season also includes the 100th episode of the series.

On August 30, 2018, Emmy Rossum announced that she would leave the series following the ninth season. On October 7, 2018, Cameron Monaghan announced that the sixth episode of the season would be his last one. However, Monaghan appeared in "Found", the season finale, and returned to the series in season ten. Christian Isaiah and Richard Flood, who portray Liam Gallagher and Ford Kellogg respectively, were promoted to the main cast.

Plot
The ninth season of Shameless picks up with the aftermath of Ian's arrest: Fiona attempts to pay for Ian's bail by getting the apartment building appraised, while Ian becomes a leader for the gay inmates in prison. His court date impending, Ian is encouraged by his followers to take the case to trial to further publicize the Gay Jesus movement. Facing ten to thirteen years if he takes the case to trial, Ian—under Fiona's advice—decides to plead not guilty by reason of insanity; he is ultimately sentenced to two years in prison. Ian discovers that Mickey is his prison cellmate, and the reunited lovers rekindle their relationship.
 
Lip works towards becoming Xan's legal guardian, and bribes Xan's biological mother Mercy into granting him custody. However, when Xan has a heartfelt reunion with Mercy, Lip realizes that Xan would rather live with her mother. Later in the season, Lip begins dating Cami's sister Tami (Kate Miner), whom he initially met at Brad's wedding. Meanwhile, Debbie begins expressing an attraction to women, pursuing a relationship with a lesbian co-worker, Alex (Ashley Romans). Debbie later develops a crush on Carl's new girlfriend Kelly, though Kelly rejects Debbie's advances. At the ER, Frank meets Dr. Ingrid Jones (Katey Sagal), a mentally unstable therapist who wants to have children. Frank impregnates Ingrid with septuplets, but Ingrid leaves Frank for her ex-husband.
 
Fiona and Ford's relationship strains when she makes a deal with investor Max Whitford (Neal Bledsoe) and invests $100,000 into a senior living home being built in the neighborhood. After meeting with Max, Fiona discovers she owes a $25,000 expansion for the senior living home, and is unable to take back her initial investment. In addition to her financial troubles, Fiona’s problems are compounded when she, after tracking Ford’s cell phone, discovers that Ford has a secret wife and kid. Drunk and furious, Fiona angrily ends her relationship with Ford and crashes her car into a nearby vehicle.
 
Ford's revelation spurs Fiona into a downwards spiral. She goes on a drinking binge, and her constant drunkenness causes her to get fired from Patsy's. With Fiona's absence, Debbie begins taking charge at the Gallagher home. In order to maintain her credit, Max offers to buy Fiona's apartment building, which is subsequently demolished. Meanwhile, Xan returns to the Gallagher home after being abandoned by Mercy. Lip plans to adopt Xan, but his chances are ruined when a drunken Fiona answers the door during an unannounced DCFS visit. The DCFS worker concludes the Gallagher home unsuitable for Xan, and she is transferred to a foster home. Attempting to apologize to Lip, Fiona visits Brad's motorcycle shop and meets Lip's sponsee, Jason, who has recently celebrated 100 days of sobriety. Unaware about Jason's sobriety, Fiona drinks vodka in front of Jason, causing him to relapse. Lip blames Fiona for both incidents and angrily kicks her out of the house.
 
Following the fallout between her and Lip, Fiona begins attending AA meetings and is able to make amends with Lip and her former co-workers. Meanwhile, Lip discovers that Tami is pregnant, and contemplates whether he will be a good father. Fiona briefly reunites with Max, who offers to buy her out of her $100,000 investment. Now with a chance to get her life back on track, Fiona decides she needs a fresh start and announces her plans to leave Chicago. She visits Ian in prison, who is supportive of her decision. Fiona also shares a brief moment with Frank, who thanks her for taking care of the kids following Monica's departure.
 
The Gallaghers plan a goodbye party for Fiona, but she departs before the party begins. Debbie finds an envelope of $50,000 that Fiona left on the kitchen fridge. Fiona hops on a plane going to an unknown destination, finally ready to start her life anew.

Cast and characters

Main
 William H. Macy as Frank Gallagher
 Emmy Rossum as Fiona Gallagher
 Jeremy Allen White as Philip "Lip" Gallagher
 Ethan Cutkosky as Carl Gallagher
 Shanola Hampton as Veronica "V" Fisher
 Steve Howey as Kevin "Kev" Ball
 Emma Kenney as Debbie Gallagher
 Cameron Monaghan as Ian Gallagher (episodes 1–6, 14)
 Richard Flood as Ford Kellogg (episodes 1–7, 9)
 Christian Isaiah as Liam Gallagher

Special guest
 Dan Lauria as Maurice "Mo" White
 Dennis Cockrum as Terry Milkovich
 Katey Sagal as Ingrid Jones
 Courteney Cox as Jen Wagner
 Noel Fisher as Mickey Milkovich

Recurring
 Jim Hoffmaster as Kermit
 Michael Patrick McGill as Tommy
 Scott Michael Campbell as Brad
 Amirah Johnson as Alexandra "Xan" Galvez
 Juliette Angelo as Geneva
 Kate Miner as Tami Tamietti
 Ashley Romans as Alex
 Paul Dooley as Ralph
 Jess Gabor as Kelly Keefe
Joy Osmanski as Dr. Kwan
 Luis Guzmán as Mikey O'Shea
 Neal Bledsoe as Max Whitford

Guests
 Sammi Hanratty as Kassidi Gallagher
 Bob Saget as Father D’Amico
 Andy Buckley as Randy
 Sharon Lawrence as Margo Mierzejewski

Episodes

Ratings

Critical reception
Review aggregator Rotten Tomatoes gives the ninth season 73%, based on 11 reviews. The critics consensus reads, "Shameless enters its ninth season on a tight budget of fresh stories left to tell, but still finds some rich new notes of characterization—all while gracefully bidding adieu to Emmy Rossum."

References

External links
 
 

Shameless (American TV series)
2018 American television seasons
2019 American television seasons